Statistics of American Soccer League II in season 1940–41.

Metropolitan Division

New England Division

First half

Second half

Playoffs

Fall River wins, 6-3, on aggregate.

References

American Soccer League (1933–1983) seasons
Amer